William Eugene "Gene" Vuckovich (March 9, 1936 - July 12, 2022) was an American politician who served as a member of the Montana Senate for the 39th district from 2011 to 2019. He was elected for Senate District 39, representing the Anaconda, Montana area, in 2010. Vuckovich was a former city-county manager of Anaconda-Deer Lodge County. He could not run for re-election because of term limits.

References

1936 births
Living people
Democratic Party Montana state senators
21st-century American politicians
People from Anaconda, Montana